{{DISPLAYTITLE:C22H27FO5}}
The molecular formula C22H27FO5 (molar mass: 390.45 g/mol) may refer to:

 Fluocortin, a corticosteroid
 Fluprednidene, a synthetic glucocorticoid corticosteroid

Molecular formulas